Kalophrynus menglienicus is a species of frog in the family Microhylidae. It is known from the vicinity of its type locality in Menglian County in southern Yunnnan, China, and from northern Vietnam; it is likely to occur in adjacent Myanmar and northern Laos. Common names Menglien grainy frog, Menglien narrow-mouthed frog, and Menglien dwarf sticky frog have been coined for this species, in reference to the type locality, as is the specific name menglienicus.

Description
Males measure  in snout–vent length (female length is unknown). The body is comparatively slim. The tympanum is visible. Fingers and toes are not webbed. Males have a single vocal sac.

Kalophrynus menglienicus have been observed to feed on insects, in particular ants.

Habitat and conservation
Kalophrynus menglienicus inhabits fields near forest and small ponds. Breeding takes place in ponds and flooded paddy fields. Pollution might threaten this species.

References

menglienicus
Amphibians of China
Amphibians of Vietnam
Taxonomy articles created by Polbot
Amphibians described in 1980